Daniela Martin Méndez Vasconcelos (born 18 April 1991) is a Guatemalan retired footballer who played as a defender. She has been a member of the Guatemala women's national team.

International career
Méndez capped for Guatemala at senior level during the 2010 CONCACAF Women's World Cup Qualifying (and its qualification), the 2010 Central American and Caribbean Games and the 2012 CONCACAF Women's Olympic Qualifying Tournament qualification.

References

1991 births
Living people
Guatemalan women's footballers
Guatemala women's international footballers
Women's association football defenders